Cold Brayfield is a village and civil parish in the unitary authority area of the City of Milton Keynes, Buckinghamshire, England. It is about three miles east of Olney, on the Bedfordshire border.  Nearby places are Lavendon and Turvey (over the bridge on the Bedfordshire side of the River Great Ouse). It is in the civil parish of Newton Blossomville.

Cold Brayfield is probably the place named as 'Bragenfelda' in a charter of 967. The elements of the name, 'brain' and 'field' are interpreted to mean 'open country on the crown of a hill'. The village name is later recorded in twelfth- and thirteenth-century charters as 'Brauefeld', 'Brawefeld' or 'Brauufeld', and becomes 'Cold Brayfield' towards the end of the sixteenth century. The basis for the prefix 'Cold' is not recorded.

The Church of England parish church is dedicated to St Mary the Virgin.

References

External links

 A Vision of Britain through time: Cold Brayfield

Villages in Buckinghamshire
Areas of Milton Keynes
Civil parishes in Buckinghamshire
Populated places on the River Great Ouse